For the county in eastern Ontario see Dundas County, Ontario. For the  upper tier county, see United Counties of Stormont, Dundas and Glengarry.

Dundas  is a community and town in Hamilton, Ontario, Canada. It is nicknamed the Valley Town because of its topographical location at the bottom of the Niagara Escarpment on the western edge of Lake Ontario. The population has been stable for decades at about twenty thousand, largely because it has not annexed rural land from the protected Dundas Valley Conservation Area.

Notable events are the Buskerfest in early June, and the Dundas Cactus Festival in August.

History and politics

First Nations peoples have inhabited the Dundas area for as much as 10,000 years. The first European to visit the area was Etienne Brulé in 1616, who noted that about 40,000 "Neutrals" lived in the Burlington Bay area.

History and politics to 1974
The location of Dundas was a prime location for hunting wildfowl, hence a "hunter's paradise" and was unofficially named Coote's Paradise. It was renamed Dundas in 1814. It was named after the Dundas military road (also known as Governor's Road) that passed through the village, the road in turn named after Scottish politician Henry Dundas who died in 1811.

In 1846, this "manufacturing village" had a population of just over 1,700. The Desjardins Canal had been completed and connected the community with Lake Ontario allowing for convenient shipping of goods. A great deal of cut stone was obtained from the "mountain" and much of it was shipped to Toronto. There were six chapels or churches, a fire company and a post office. Industry included two grist mills, a furniture factory, a cloth factory and two foundries (for making steam engines). Tradesmen of various types also worked here. Four schools, six taverns, three breweries and a bank agency were operating.   
 Dundas was incorporated in 1847 from parts of West Flamborough Township and Ancaster Township in Wentworth County, Canada West.
 
The Great Western Railway (GWR) put their line through Dundas in 1853, but it was not until 1864 that the first Dundas station was built. By 1869 the population was 3500 and was known as a small manufacturing centre.

In the late 18th and early 19th centuries, Dundas enjoyed considerable economic prosperity through its access to Lake Ontario via the Desjardins Canal, and was an important town in Upper Canada and Canada West. It was later surpassed as the economic powerhouse of the area by Hamilton, but for decades it led in importance.  A number of Ontario cities (including Toronto) retain streets named Dundas Street, which serve as evidence of its one-time importance. Dundas was once the terminus of Toronto's Dundas Street (also known as Highway 5), one of the earliest routes used by Ontario's first settlers.

With the establishment of McMaster University in nearby west Hamilton in 1930, Dundas gradually became a bedroom community of the university faculty and students, with a thriving arts community. Dundas has a large community of potters and several studio shows/walking tours of the town feature their work each year.

Demographics
Source:

The 2001 census population of Dundas was 24,394.

Visible minority status:
 1.41% South Asian
 1.19% Chinese
 0.79% Black
 2.32% Other Minorities

Religion:
 43.57% Protestant
 26.94% Catholic
 19.83% No religious affiliation
 3.62% Jewish
 6.04% Other religions

Age characteristics of the population:
 0–14 years: 18.29%
 15–64 years: 63.53%
 65 years and over: 18.18%

Culture

Fine arts

The Dundas Museum & Archives, located at 139 Park St. West, was established in 1956. Their collections, exhibits, and events showcase how Canadian history and geography has unfolded in the unique Dundas Valley. Several local events also take place at the Museum, including art shows, book launches, community celebrations, and more.

Dundas is home to the Dundas Valley School of Art. Marion Farnan and Emily Dutton established it in 1964, and it became a non-profit corporation three years later. Since 1970, it has been located in the former Canada Screw Works building from the 1860s. It began a full-time diploma programme with McMaster University in 1998.

The Carnegie Gallery is housed in the 1910 Carnegie library building and celebrated its 25th anniversary in 2005. It is run by the Dundas Art & Craft Association and hosts art exhibitions, book readings, concerts, McMaster custom framing and a gift shop.

Music
"Dundas, Ontario" is also the title of a song from the album Start Breaking My Heart by the artist Caribou (formerly Manitoba), a native of the town. Dundas' sobriquet The Valley Town is used as the title of a song on the album Mountain Meadows by the band Elliott Brood; one of the band members, Casey Laforet, spent part of his childhood in Dundas. The town has produced other independent artists including Junior Boys, Orphx, Koushik, and smaller bands such as Winter Equinox and The Dirty Nil. Folk singer Stan Rogers, who died in an airplane fire in 1983, lived in Dundas. He grew up in the Hannon area and moved to Dundas as an adult. He is best remembered for his songs about Canada's Atlantic provinces.

Another one of Dundas' sons who came to fame as a singer/songwriter is Ryan van Sickle. A notable aspect of his career is that he was one of the first musicians to embrace Google's social platform Google+ and used it to become successful as an independent reggaeton artist with his album "Ghosts of the Brokenhearted".

Dundas is home to the Dundas Valley Orchestra. The DVO is an amateur, community orchestra and was founded in the fall of 1978 by Arthur Vogt. Many have made the DVO a way station en route to successful musical careers. Former conductors include Rosemary Thomson, Michael Hall, Stephane Potvin and Dr. Glenn Alan Mallory. The DVO is currently conducted by Laura Thomas.

Dundas is also the home of Dundas Concert Band.  The Dundas Concert Band was established in 1873 as a military band.  In 1923, the band was renamed "The Dundas Citizens' Band" and
became known as the Dundas Concert Band in the early 1940s.  The Dundas Concert Band's "Concerts in the Park" series have been put on at the Dundas Driving Park Bandshell since 1958.

Dundas Conservatory of Music  is located in historic downtown Dundas and has been providing musical instruction in the community for thirty years.

Avalon Music Academy is in its 19th year of creating and nurturing musicians, many of whom have gone on to be professional performers. It was founded by Steve Parton, and is based out of the historic St. Paul's United Church.

Film
Because of Dundas' 19th century downtown architecture, films such as Haven, Cabin Fever, Wrong Turn,  and others have made use of its location.  In December 2005, major filming was completed for Man of the Year, starring Robin Williams.  Mr. Williams delighted townsfolk, taking time for pictures and autographs in the downtown core.

In early December 2004, The West Wing did some filming; remaking parts of Dundas (Town hall, a residence, and Deluxe Restaurant) into New Hampshire locales. The three episodes aired in late January and early February 2005. Several dozen fans of the show braved chilly weather to witness the snail's pace of television filming and grab autographs and photos with celebrities.

In September 2007, a scene of The Incredible Hulk was filmed around the exterior and inside the DeLuxe Restaurant in Dundas, and other scenes were filmed at other locations in Hamilton.

From 2004–2007 parts of the YTV program Dark Oracle were also filmed in Dundas.

From 2015 until present, parts of the W Network series The Good Witch have been filmed in Dundas.

Sports

The Dundas Blues are a junior ice hockey team from Dundas, they play in the Provincial Junior Hockey League.

The Dundas Real McCoys are a senior ice hockey team from Dundas, they play in the Ontario Hockey Association's Allan Cup Hockey league.  The Real McCoys won the 1986 Hardy Cup as Senior "AA" Champions of Canada.

On April 3, 2010, NHL Commissioner Gary Bettman named Dundas the winner of the 2010 Kraft Hockeyville competition during a live announcement on Hockey Night in Canada.  As a result of being named the winner, the community received $100,000 CAD in arena upgrades, and got to host an NHL pre-season game between the Ottawa Senators and Buffalo Sabres prior to the 2010–11 season.

After existing for 93 years, the Dundas Chiefs senior baseball team folded in 2010. The "Chiefs" had won 11 Ontario Baseball Association provincial titles over the years with the first in 1961 and the last in 2001.  Their success included 3 straight titles from 1976 to 1978 and back-to-back titles in 1987 and 1988.

Schools
 Central Park – Elementary School (Closed)
 Cornerstones Hamilton Special Needs Services @ Dundas Valley Secondary School - Adult Day Program
 Dundana – Elementary School
 Dundas Central Public – Elementary School
 Dundas District – High School (Closed June 1982)
 Dundas District – Middle School (Closed November 5, 2007)
 Dundas Valley Montessori School – Private Elementary School
 Dundas Valley Secondary School – High School (Formed by the amalgamation of Highland and Parkside Secondary Schools)
 Highland – High School (Closed June 2014-amalgamated with Parkside Secondary School)
 Yorkview – Elementary School
 St. Augustine – Catholic Elementary
 St. Bernadette – Catholic Elementary
 Sir William Osler – Elementary School
 Parkside – High School (Closed June 2014-amalgamated with Highland Secondary School)
 Pleasant Valley – Elementary School (Closed)
 Providence Christian School – Independent Elementary School
 SiTE Schools Dundas - Private Montessori based High School

Geography

Waterfalls
Dundas is near to two commonly visited waterfalls that are located in the abutting district of Flamborough. These are Webster's Falls (named after Joseph Webster) and Tew's Falls. Both waterfalls are accessible by the Bruce trail leading to the Dundas Peninsula.

In 1819, Joseph Webster purchased property on the escarpment above Dundas, including the waterfall which still bears his family's name. In 1856, his son built a huge stone flour mill just above the falls but it was destroyed by fire in 1898. After the fire one of the first hydro-electric generators in Ontario was built at the base of the falls. In 1931, a former Dundas mayor, Colonel W.E.S. Knowles, generously bequeathed monies so that the area surrounding Webster's Falls could be made into a public park.

Dundas Peak

Dundas is also near to the Dundas Peak, which is located in the abutting district of Flamborough. The Peak overlooks Dundas from The Bruce Trail in Flamborough and has become one of the most visited parts of Dundas. Hikers can take the Bruce Trail from Tews or Webster's Falls to the peak and look over Dundas and West Hamilton.

Landmarks

Dundas is famous for The Collins Hotel, the longest running hotel in Ontario. One feature of the building is a front portico with four fluted Doric columns; above them are triglyphs and metopes found on a traditional Doric entablature with a discrete cornice. The roof has a series of dormers with Florentine pediments. There are two floors to the hotel, the second of which has a balcony running the full length of the building. On the street level there are shops.

Notable people
John H. Bryden, novelist
John Ellison singer and songwriter who wrote "Some Kind of Wonderful" lives in Dundas.
 Mackenzie Hughes professional golfer raised in Dundas.
 John Douglas Smith Multiple Emmy Award Winning Motion Picture Sound Editor raised in Dundas.
 William Osler Canadian physician  was raised in Dundas.
 Stan Rogers folk singer lived in Dundas; his wife, Ariel, still lives there.
 Daniel V. Snaith, musician also known as "Manitoba" and "Caribou", grew up in Dundas and wrote a song called "Dundas, Ontario".
 Dave Thomas actor and comedian  from SCTV grew up in Dundas.
 Ian Thomas singer, songwriter, Juno Award winner, actor and author. He is the younger brother of comedian and actor Dave Thomas. 
 Don Thomson Jr. race car driver grew up in Dundas. He is a five time CASCAR Series Champion.
 David Vienneau, journalist, grew up in Dundas.
Pete Wood, major league pitcher from the 19th century.

Sister city
 Kaga, Ishikawa, Japan
 Otjiwarongo, Namibia

See also 
 King Street (Dundas, Hamilton, Ontario)

References

External links

 DowntownDundas.ca – Business Improvement Area
 Dundas Museum & Archives

 
Neighbourhoods in Hamilton, Ontario
Populated places established in 1848
Populated places disestablished in 2000
Former towns in Ontario